Nordbygdi is a village in the municipality of Bykle in Agder county, Norway. It is located in the Setesdalen valley along the northeastern shore of the lake, Botsvatn.

The village includes three farm areas: Nesland, Tveiti, and Holen.  Most of the farms and houses in this village were moved away during the late-1970s when the Botsvatn dam was built to create the large lake/reservoir Botsvatn.

References

Villages in Agder
Bykle